Niger competed at the 1968 Summer Olympics in Mexico City, Mexico.

They fielded two boxers, both men.

Boxing
Men

References
Official Olympic Reports
Part Three: Results

Nations at the 1968 Summer Olympics
1968
1968 in Niger